Sport-Express is a Russian daily sports newspaper founded by Vladimir Kuchmiy. Printed in 31 cities of Russia, Latvia, Belarus, Ukraine, Kazakhstan, and the United States, it is the biggest-selling sports newspaper in Russia, with the daily audience of over 700,000 people.

Sport-Express was founded in 1991. It is a part of European Sports Media.

Notable journalists
 Vsevolod Kukushkin, ice hockey and sports correspondent (22 years)
 Elena Vaytsekhovskaya,   sports correspondent (26 years)
 Aksel Vartanyan, sports historian
 Vladimir Kuchmiy, founder and chief editor (18 years)
 Igor Rabiner, football reviewer and sports correspondent (1994-2012, since 2014)
 Alexey Popov, Formula One correspondent

See also
List of non-English newspapers with English language subsections
Sovetsky Sport

References

External links
Official website
Covering All the Games
 

Russian-language newspapers published in Russia
Sports newspapers
Publications established in 1991
Sports mass media in Russia
1991 establishments in Russia